Ali Al-Baluchi (born 6 April 1959) is a Kuwaiti boxer. He competed in the men's super heavyweight event at the 1988 Summer Olympics.

References

External links
 

1959 births
Living people
Kuwaiti male boxers
Olympic boxers of Kuwait
Boxers at the 1988 Summer Olympics
Place of birth missing (living people)
Super-heavyweight boxers